Religion in Cyprus is dominated by Eastern Orthodox branch of Christianity, whose adherents make up 73% of the total population of the entire island. Most Greek Cypriots are members of the autocephalous Greek Orthodox 'Church of Cyprus'. Most Turkish Cypriots are officially Sunni Muslims. There are also Baháʼí, Catholic, Jewish, Protestant (including Anglican), Maronite, Armenian Apostolic, and non-religious communities in Cyprus.

Christianity

Greek Orthodox Church of Cyprus

The largest and most important church in Cyprus, the Church of Cyprus, is an autocephalous Greek Orthodox Church within the Orthodox tradition using the Greek liturgy. It is one of the oldest Eastern Orthodox autocephalous churches, achieving independence from the Patriarchate of Antioch and All the East in 431 A.D. The bishop of the ancient capital, 
constituted metropolitan by Emperor Zeno, with the title archbishop. The first Bishops that held Christian ministries in Cyprus were Apostle Lazarus (Church of Saint Lazarus, Larnaca), Apostle Barnabas (Barnabas) and is the place of many voyages of the Apostles after the resurrection of Christ. The Church of Cyprus recognizes the seniority and prestige of the ecumenical patriarch in Constantinople, while retaining complete administrative autonomy under its own archbishop. Seven sacraments are recognized: baptism in infancy, followed by confirmation with consecrated oil, penance, the Eucharist, matrimony, ordination, and unction in times of sickness or when near death.

Many Classical Christian architecture and buildings are located in Cyprus; along with the former tomb of Apostle Lazarus and tomb of Apostle Barnabas. Cyprus is the place where many New Testament biblical stories took place, Christian miracles were performed and where the Apostles established their first churches.

Armenian Church in Cyprus

The presence of Armenians in Cyprus dates back to 578. Currently, Armenian-Cypriots maintain a notable presence of about 3,500 persons, mainly inhabiting the urban areas of Nicosia, Larnaca, and Limassol. Recently, some Armenian immigrants have settled Paphos.

The Armenian Prelature of Cyprus has had a continuous presence on the island since its establishment in 973 by Catholicos Khatchig I.

Catholic Church

The Catholic Church in Cyprus is part of the worldwide Catholic Church under the spiritual leadership of the Pope in Rome. There are around 10,000 Catholics in Cyprus, corresponding to just over 1% of the population. Most Catholics in Cyprus are Maronites (one of the Eastern Rite Catholics). In the 1891 census, of the 209,286 Cypriots, there were 1,131 were Maronites.

Protestantism

After the arrival of the British, The Anglican Church of Cyprus was established in 1878. As of 1976, it falls under the Diocese of Cyprus and the Gulf. Protestants, according to the official 2011 population census, amount to 2.02% of the population. With regard to Northern Cyprus, Anglican Church of Cyprus was established in 1878. The community numbers around 500 and can be found living throughout northern Cyprus.

Islam

Muslims make up about 25% of the Cypriot population. The island was conquered by the Ottoman General Lala Mustafa Pasha from the Venetians in 1570 A.D. This conquest brought with it Turkish settlement from 1571 to 1878 A.D. for administrative duties, military fortifications, and tax collection. Turkish Cypriots adhere to the Sunni branch of Islam.

Sufism also plays an important role. Historically, Muslims were spread over the whole of Cyprus, but since 1974 they have lived primarily in the north after the Turkish invasion. The Ahmadiyya community has a presence in the north.

Several important Islamic shrines and landmarks exist on the island, including:
 The Arabahmet Mosque in Nicosia (built in the 16th century)
 The Hala Sultan Tekke/Umm Haram Mosque in Larnaca (built in the 18th century)

Sikhism
There are about 13,280 or 1.1% Sikhs in Cyprus in 2021.

Hinduism
There were about 4,640 or 0.4% Hindus in Cyprus in 2015.

Buddhism

Judaism

Jewish presence in Cyprus dates back to the 3rd century BC, after settling on the island, they established trade relations with other religious groups. Today, approximately 1,800 Cypriots are Jewish. There is a Synagogue in Larnaca.

Atheism

According to a 2011 estimate, in the Greek-Cypriot government-controlled area, 0.6% of the people consider themselves irreligious or atheist. In 2018, the Cyprus Humanist Association accused Cyprus' Ministry of Education of discrimination against atheists by promoting anti-atheist educational material through its official website. During the 37th session of the United Nations Human Rights Council, the International Humanist Union listed Cyprus in their list of states accused of promoting hatred against atheists and humanists.

See also 

 Religion in Northern Cyprus

References

External links 
 Home
 Cyprus – Just another WordPress site